Chouteau Township is the name of two townships in the United States:

 Chouteau Township, Madison County, Illinois
 Chouteau Township, Clay County, Missouri

Township name disambiguation pages